is a 1974 Japanese animated feature film produced by Group TAC and Nippon Herald Films and directed by Gisaburō Sugii. Styled after classical Western animation, it is a musical fantasy based on the fairy tale of the same name with the screenplay by Shūji Hirami, music organization by Yū Aku and songs and score composed and arranged by Takashi Miki with Shun'ichi Tokura and Tadao Inōe. It was released in Japan on July 20, 1974 and in the United States by Columbia Pictures in 1976.

Plot
Jack resides with his mother in a small house out in the country. Being very poor, they eventually find themselves forced to sell their cow, which has stopped giving milk. Jack runs into a mysterious man on the way into town and trades the cow for a handful of "magic" beans. Jack's mother becomes angry at him and spanks him with a broom before throwing the beans out the window.

As Jack sleeps, the beanstalk grows, much to the astonishment of Jack's dog, Crosby. Crosby is even more surprised to see a mouse in a dress names Laura descending the beanstalk. Jack awakens and is also amazed at the sight of the beanstalk. The mouse convinces Jack and Crosby to accompany her up the beanstalk.

Upon arriving at the top, the trio find themselves in the courtyard of a castle, where they find a girl who appears to be in a trance looking at them. The girl, Margaret, is the princess of the castle. Her mother and father have disappeared, but she claims to be happy since she will soon be marrying her beloved prince, Tulip, who is actually a giant. Margaret introduces Jack to Tulip's mother, Madame Alisson "Alice" Hecuba, who herself is actually an evil witch that has put the princess under a spell. The witch aspires to become queen of the Land of the Clouds when Tulip and Margaret are married.

Madame Hecuba takes Jack to an upstairs dining hall, where she feeds him some soup intended to put him to sleep. She has to hide him quickly when Tulip, who is not very bright, arrives upstairs. As he is eating, Tulip smells Jack's presence. Jack manages to escape, much to the chagrin of Hecuba, who orders Tulip to find him and promises to share Jack with him.

In the meantime, Jack meets more clothed mice Nigel, Tammy and George as well as a talking harp. The harp initially starts calling for the giant, but is quick to cooperate when the mice and Jack persuade her that it would be in her best interest. She reveals that Madame Hecuba got rid of the king and queen and turned the people of the castle into mice. Tulip comes into the treasure room and Jack witnesses a golden hen lay a golden egg. The harp also reveals that the witch's spell must be renewed daily.

Jack decides to grab the hen and as much treasure as he can carry and make his way back down the beanstalk. In the process, he tricks Tulip into thinking he fell to his doom. Jack and his mother celebrate their new-found fortune until Crosby persuades Jack that he should stop the princess from marrying the giant.

With fresh determination to help the princess, Jack ascends the beanstalk a second time. He learns from the harp that the spell over the princess can be broken with a kiss from someone who is truly brave. Jack crashes the mock wedding and gives Margaret a kiss. The witch and the giant are both angered when Margaret returns to normal and recognizes them for who they are. A chase ensues, and Jack eventually faces Madame Hecuba again. Tulip enters the room and prepares to step on Jack when, at the last moment, he turns on his mother and steps on her instead.

With the witch destroyed, the mice turn back into people and the castle starts to return to normal. The giant is still around, however, and chases Jack and Crosby. The two eventually climb down the beanstalk with Tulip in hot pursuit, and cut the beanstalk down upon reaching the bottom, causing Tulip to fall to his death. Sometime later, Jack and Crosby look up to the clouds, thinking about their friends in the sky.

Characters
 
 Animated by: Shigeru Yamamoto
 

 
 Animated by: Tsuneo Maeda
 

 Old bean-seller
 

 
 Animated by: Teruhito Ueguchi
 

 , or Madame Alice Hecuba in the English dub
 Animated by: Kazuko Nakamura
 

 
 Animated by: Takateru Miwa

 
 Animated by: Kanji Akahori
 

 
 

 
 

 
 

 
 Animated by: Toshio Hirata

 
 Animated by: Toshio Hirata

 
 Animated by: Kanji Akahori

Production
It is the first feature directed by Sugii or animated by Group TAC and the second film under that arrangement, following as it did the just previously produced half-hour educational film The History of Mutual Aid: The Story of Life Insurance.

Release
As of July 2011, a transfer of the film by Atlas International is available on DVD-Video, with both the English and Japanese audio but only dubtitles, from Hen's Tooth Video .

Soundtrack
ミュージカル・ファンタジィ"ジャックと豆の木" was released in Japan in July 1974. Catalog# AQ-4001.

Track listing
 タイトル・口上（左　とん平）
 朝の歌（ジャックと豆の木・オリジナルキャスト）
 生きて行くきまり（ア・ティムス）
 豆売りの曲
 奇跡の歌（山本リンダ）
 完全にしあわせ（山本リンダ）
 私は何でも知っている（一谷伸江）
 食べては駄目よ（一谷伸江）
 チューのスキャット（ア・ティムス＋ジャックと豆の木・オリジナルキャスト）
 お前はみにくい（悠木千帆(＝樹木希林)）
 おあいにくさま（市村正親）
 これが成功の道（上村一夫）
 これが男の道（上村一夫）
 長い間の夢（悠木千帆）
 愛してますか（日下武史）
 もとへ戻りなさい（ア・ティムス）
 巨人さんこちら（市村正親）
 さよならジャック（山本リンダ＋ジャックと豆の木・オリジナルキャスト）
 追い出しの歌（左　とん平）

Reception
The English-dubbed version received mixed opinions from U.S. critics.  Henry Herx wrote in his Family Guide to Movies on Video: "Its songs are insipid and the animation rather primitive[;] still it moves along at a lively enough pace and may amuse younger children."  Richard Eder of The New York Times remarked: "The lines are blurry, the colors muddy, and the action is blocklike. When the characters' lips move up and down, the words come out sideways."  He ended his short review with this comment: "It is the kind of thing grandfathers are sent out to send their grandchildren to. They will sit silently, side by side, and a quiet loathing will come up between them." In 2010, Michael R. Pitts said that the songs are "forgettable".  Conversely, the writers of Jerry Beck's Animated Movie Guide hailed it as "A successful Japanese emulation of American fairy tale theatrical cartoon features with many delightful songs", and gave it four stars.

References

External links

 Jack and the Beanstalk (1974) at The Internet Movie Database
 Jack to Mame no Ki: Animemorial
 AniPages Daily: Jack and the Beanstalk
 Cartoon Brew TV #12: Anime Trailers
 

1974 films
1974 animated films
1974 anime films
1970s musical films
Animated musical films
Anime and manga based on fairy tales
Columbia Pictures films
Columbia Pictures animated films
1974 directorial debut films
Films based on Jack and the Beanstalk
Films directed by Gisaburō Sugii
Group TAC
Japanese animated fantasy films
Japanese animated science fiction films
Japanese musical fantasy films
Rock musicals
Films about hypnosis
1970s children's animated films
1970s American films